Ethiopian studies or Ethiopian and Eritrean studies refers to a multidisciplinary academic cluster dedicated to research on Ethiopia and Eritrea within the cultural and historical context of the Horn of Africa.

Overview

The classical concept of Ethiopian and Eritrean studies, developed by European scholars, is based on disciplines like philology and linguistics, history and ethnography. It includes the study of Ethiopian and Eritrean arts and the history and theology of the Ethiopian Orthodox Church. The classical core of Ethiopian and Eritrean studies is the philology of the written sources of Christian Ethiopia and Eritrea and Ethio-semitic linguistics. While this approach is still alive and has its role, Ethiopian and Eritrean studies has opened to a wider concept that tries to avoid a bias in favour of the Christian Abyssinian culture (Amhara, Tigrinya; cf. Habesha people). It includes the study of the other Afro-Asiatic languages and cultures of Ethiopia and Eritrea besides those of Ethio-semitic derivation; the nation's non-Afro-Asiatic languages and cultures, including the southern Ethiopian cultures; non-Christian faiths, comprising Islam in Ethiopia and Eritrea and traditional religions; social and political sciences; as well as contemporary issues like environment and development studies.

Institute of Ethiopian Studies
The study of Ethiopian and Eritrean topics had been long been concentrated in European academic institutions. This is seen in such examples as Enno Littmann directing the German Aksum-Expedition in Ethiopia in 1905. When Italy invaded Ethiopia, some Italian scholars such as Enrico Cerulli were active in Ethiopia. As a result, many Ethiopian manuscript collections and other materials from Ethiopia are found in European museums and libraries.

Ethiopian studies began a new era in 1963 when the Institute of Ethiopian Studies was founded on the campus of Haile Selassie University (which was later renamed Addis Ababa University). The heart of the IES is the library, containing a wide variety of published and unpublished materials on all types of matters related to Ethiopia and the Horn of Africa.

Conferences
Ethiopian and Eritrean studies scholars congregate at the interdisciplinary International Conference of Ethiopian Studies, a series of gatherings that takes place every three years. Traditionally, every third conference is held in Ethiopia. The 19th meeting was in Warsaw, August 24–28, 2015. The 20th conference was in Mekelle, Ethiopia, in 2018. Volumes of proceedings are published after most conferences.

Journals and publications
Ethiopian and Eritrean studies is served by a few journals and publications specifically devoted to the field. These include:

Journal of Ethiopian Studies (Ethiopia)
ITYOPIS Northeast African Journal of Social Sciences and Humanities (Ethiopia)
Annales d'Éthiopie (France)  
Aethiopica: International Journal of Ethiopian and Eritrean Studies (Germany)
Rassegna di Studi Etiopici (Italy)
Northeast African Studies (US)
Encyclopaedia Aethiopica (Germany)
Journal of Oromo Studies (US)
International Journal of Ethiopian Studies (US)

Notable Ethiopianists
 Amsalu Aklilu
 Bahru Zewde
 Getatchew Haile
 Merid Wolde Aregay
 Mesfin Woldemariam
 Ephraim Isaac
 Taddesse Tamrat
 Antoine d'Abbadie
 Lionel Bender
 Enrico Cerulli
 Marcel Cohen
 Carlo Conti Rossini
 August Dillmann
 Harold C. Fleming
 Angelo Del Boca
 Robert Hetzron
 Olga Kapeliuk
 Wolf Leslau
 Donald N. Levine
 Enno Littmann
 Hiob Ludolf
 Thomas Lambdin (US)
 Richard Pankhurst
 Alula Pankhurst
 Edward Ullendorff
 Lanfranco Ricci
 David Appleyard
 Haggai Erlich
 Alessandro Bausi
 Steve Kaplan

See also
Somali studies

References

Abbink, Jon G. 1991: Ethiopian Society and History: a Bibliography of Ethiopian Studies, 1957-1990. Leiden.
Abbink, Jon, 1995: Eritreo-Ethiopian Studies in Society and History 1960-1995: a Supplementary Bibliography. Leiden.
Abbink, Jon, 2010: A Bibliography of Ethiopian-Eritrean Studies in Society and History 1995-2010.  Addis Ababa & Leiden.
Baye Yimam. 2009. Five Decades of Ethiopian Studies. Journal of Ethiopian Studies 42.1/2: v-xi.
Kropp, Manfred 1994, "From Manuscripts to the Computer: Ethiopian Studies in the Last 150 Years". In: K.J. Cathcart (ed.): The Edward Hincks Bicentenary Lectures. Dublin . pp. 117–35.
Uhlig, Siegbert, et al. (eds.) (2005). "Ethiopian Studies". In: Encyclopaedia Aethiopica, Vol. 2: D-Ha. Wiesbaden: Harrassowitz Verlag. pp. 433f-38.

External links
http://www.ies-ethiopia.org/indexf.htm
http://www.tsehaipublishers.com/ijes/
https://web.archive.org/web/20080719121217/http://www.oromostudies.org/JOS.htm
https://web.archive.org/web/20080731153021/http://www.ifeas.uni-mainz.de/index.html
https://www.aai.uni-hamburg.de/en/ethiostudies/study.html

 
Ethiopian culture
Eritrean culture
African studies
Christianity in Ethiopia
Christianity in Eritrea
 
Libraries in Ethiopia
Libraries in Eritrea